"Girls with Guitars" is a song written by Mary Chapin Carpenter, and recorded by American country music artist Wynonna.  It was released in June 1994 as the fifth single from the album Tell Me Why.  The song reached number 10 on the Billboard Hot Country Singles & Tracks chart. Judd's mother, Naomi Judd, and Lyle Lovett sing background vocals on the song.

Content
The song is about a young woman who pursues her desire to become a rock musician (particularly as a guitarist), despite her parents assuming more practical roles for her.

The second and third choruses begin with a reference of the famous guitar riffs of Deep Purple's "Smoke on the Water" and Cream's "Sunshine of Your Love," respectively.

Chart performance

References

1994 singles
1993 songs
Wynonna Judd songs
Songs written by Mary Chapin Carpenter
Song recordings produced by Tony Brown (record producer)
MCA Records singles
Curb Records singles
Songs with feminist themes
Songs about guitars